Cynema is a genus of fungi in the family Tricholomataceae. This is a monotypic genus, containing the single species Cynema alutacea, found in Papua New Guinea.

See also

 List of Tricholomataceae genera

References

Tricholomataceae
Monotypic Agaricales genera
Fungi of New Guinea
Taxa named by Rudolf Arnold Maas Geesteranus
Taxa named by Egon Horak